The Garth Brooks Stadium Tour was a concert tour by American singer Garth Brooks. It began on October 20, 2018 in Notre Dame, Indiana, at Notre Dame Stadium and concluded with 5 sold-out shows at Croke Park in Dublin, Ireland ending on September 17, 2022.

Background
After wrapping up his World Tour in 2017, Brooks announced a new tour in October 2018. The Stadium Tour, which began in spring 2019, will visit 30 North American stadiums, showcasing Brooks in a football-centric environment. Brooks "unofficially" kicked the tour off with a concert at Notre Dame Stadium on October 15, which was filmed as a two-hour television special for CBS. During this show, Brooks also mentioned his intent to close the tour by returning to Notre Dame.

Special performances and broadcasts
During the first concert of the tour in St. Louis, Missouri on March 9, 2019, Brooks announced portions of the show would be recorded for a future documentary to air on A&E. The documentary, titled Garth Brooks: The Road I'm On, chronicles Brooks' career and aired in December 2019.

Also during the St. Louis concert, Brooks introduced his wife, Trisha Yearwood, to perform a selection of her songs. Yearwood, who performed with Brooks on his entire World Tour from 2014 to 2017, previously stated she would not perform on the Stadium Tour. However, due to inclement weather canceling her scheduled pre-show event outside the stadium, Yearwood joined Brooks for a special performance. Yearwood also joined Brooks for the show in Gainesville, Florida on April 20, 2019 to perform a tribute to Tom Petty.

On July 19, 2019, during the first of two shows in Boise, Idaho, Blake Shelton joined Brooks to perform their song, "Dive Bar". Footage from the concert was later released as a music video.

After its stop in Detroit in February 2020, the tour was halted indefinitely due to the COVID-19 pandemic. All remaining shows were rescheduled for 2021, with the tour resuming in Las Vegas on July 10, 2021. A planned show at Nissan Stadium in Nashville, Tennessee on July 31 was postponed due to inclement weather. 

On August 18, 2021, all remaining stops on the tour were cancelled indefinitely due to SARS-CoV-2 Delta variant. All tickets were refunded, and Brooks stated that they planned to pursue rescheduling the dates in 2022.

During the July 30, 2022 show held at AT&T Stadium, Garth Brooks revealed this show was being recorded as the live album for the Stadium Tour.

Set list 
This set list is representative of the performance of March 26, 2022 in Orlando, Florida. It does not represent all concerts for the duration of the series.Main set
"Ain't Goin' Down ('Til the Sun Comes Up)"
"Rodeo"
"Two of a Kind, Workin' on a Full House"
"The Beaches of Cheyenne"
"Two Piña Coladas"
"The River"
"Fishin' in the Dark" (Nitty Gritty Dirt Band cover)
"The Thunder Rolls"
"Unanswered Prayers"
"If Tomorrow Never Comes"
"Much Too Young (To Feel This Damn Old)"
"Ask Me How I Know"
"That Summer"
"Callin' Baton Rouge"
"Shameless" (Billy Joel cover)
"Piano Man" (Billy Joel cover)
"You Never Even Called Me by My Name" (Steve Goodman cover)
"American Pie" (Don McLean cover)
"Papa Loved Mama"
"Friends in Low Places"
"The Dance"
"Housekeeping" fan-request set
"Every Now and Then"
"Amie" (Pure Prairie League cover)
"A Friend to Me"
"Make You Feel My Love" (Bob Dylan cover)
"All-American Kid"
"Last Night I Had the Strangest Dream" (Pete Seeger cover)
"How Sweet It Is (To Be Loved by You)" (Marvin Gaye cover)
"The Red Strokes"
Encore
"Shallow" (duet with Trisha Yearwood)
"Walkaway Joe" (Trisha Yearwood cover) (duet with Trisha Yearwood)
"Standing Outside the Fire"

Tour dates

Cancelled shows

Notes

Personnel
Below is the personnel from the concert in St. Louis, Missouri. It may not reflect the personnel from each concert on the tour.

 Robert Bailey – backing vocals
 Garth Brooks – vocals, acoustic guitar, electric guitar
 Ty England – acoustic guitar, backing vocals
 David Gant – keyboards
 Mark Greenwood – bass guitar, backing vocals
 Vicki Hampton – backing vocals
 Gordon Kennedy – electric guitar
 Chris Leuzinger – electric guitar
 Blair Masters – keyboards, accordion
 Jimmy Mattingly – fiddle, acoustic guitar
 Steve McClure – pedal steel guitar, electric guitar
 Mike Palmer – drums, percussion
 Bobby Terry – acoustic guitar, backing vocals

References

2019 concert tours
2020 concert tours
Garth Brooks concert tours